Khomokhoana is a community council located in the Leribe District of Lesotho. Its population in 2006 was 26,851.

Villages
The community of Khomokhoana includes the villages of

Ha MoholisaHa ChakaHa ChonapaseHa KenaHa 'MathataHa 'Mathata (Ha Felaphe)Ha 'Mathata (Sekoting)

Ha 'Mathata (Temong)Ha MatsoeteHa MotlalehiHa NyenyeHa Nyenye (Korosong)Ha Nyenye (Likoting)

Ha Nyenye (Thoteng)KholokoeKhomo-Lia-OelaMaputsoeMatikiringPopopoTaung

References

External links
 Google map of community villages

Populated places in Leribe District